Sainte-Colombe-sur-Seine (literally Sainte-Colombe on Seine) is a commune in the Côte-d'Or department in eastern France.

Population

Iron Age and Antiquity

Located not far from the site of the Vix grave, Sainte-Colombe is on a very rich archaeological territory. In the 19th century, several Hallstatt-era burial mounds containing wagon burials were excavated at the request of Napoleon III. The first, located at a place called La Garenne, provided in 1846 a magnificent bronze lebes of Etruscan origin, now displayed in the Musée du Pays Châtillonnais in Châtillon-sur-Seine. In another, at La Butte, gold bracelets and earrings were discovered in the grave of a woman laid to rest on an iron-clad funerary wagon. These gold items are now kept at the National Archeological Museum in Saint-Germain-en-Laye.

In the middle of the twentieth century René Joffroy (1958) postulated that the elites buried under the tumulus of La Butte and La Garenne had Mont Lassois as their place of residence. However geomagnetic surveys carried out in 2015 revealed the presence of several large buildings in the vicinity of the Sainte-Colombe burial mounds, suggesting that they may have also lived nearby.

The remains of several Gallo-Roman villas were discovered in 1851. Part of a mortuary column representing Venus and a sculpture of a draped woman discovered in 1867 are now kept in the Musée du pays Châtillonnais.

See also
Communes of the Côte-d'Or department
Vix Grave
Lavau, Aube

External links
Musée du Pays Châtillonnais – Celtes et Gaulois

References

Communes of Côte-d'Or